Tajio James (born 17 December 2003) is a Barbadian footballer who plays as a midfielder for the Feather River Golden Eagles and the Barbados national team.

Club career
As a youth James was part of the KFC Pinelands Football Academy and Pro Shottas United. With the latter he won a number of youth titles. For the 2020 Barbados Premier League season he was part of the youth movement at UWI Blackbirds FC. He scored his first two Premier League goals on 3 March 2020 in a 4–0 victory over Brittons Hill FC.

In August 2021 it was announced that James and fellow-Barbadian Devonte Richards had received a scholarship to play college soccer in the United States for the Golden Eagles of Feather River College. During his first season with the team, James tallied nine assists and a team-high thirteen goals as Feather River College won the CCCAA Golden Valley Conference Championship. Late in the season he was leading the conference in both goals and points. Following his sophomore season, James was named to the second team of the United Soccer Coaches 2022 Junior College Division III All-America Team.

International career
James represented Barbados as a youth at the U15 and U17 levels, including three appearances in the 2019 CONCACAF U-17 Championship. He received his first senior call-up by head coach Russell Latapy in February 2021. He was called up again for the 2022–23 CONCACAF Nations League B. James went on to make his senior international debut on 2 June 2022 in Barbados's opening match against Antigua and Barbuda.

James scored his first senior international goal in a 1–1 friendly draw with Grenada on 22 February 2023. Two days later he scored two more goals in another draw with the same opponent.

International goals
Scores and results list Barbados's goal tally first.

International career statistics

References

External links

Feather River College profile

BFA profile

Living people
2003 births
Barbadian footballers
Association football midfielders
People from Bridgetown